The Cape Verde national football team represents Cape Verde in men's international football, and is controlled by the Cape Verdean Football Federation. The team has never qualified for the FIFA World Cup, but has qualified for three Africa Cup of Nations tournaments, in 2013, 2015 and 2021.

History

Overview
Cape Verde became independent from Portugal in 1975. The national team's first international was a 1–0 defeat to Guinea on 29 May 1978, in a tournament in Guinea-Bissau. The Cape Verdean Football Federation was formed in 1982, and joined FIFA in 1986.

Cape Verdeans abroad, who are more numerous than the population of the islands themselves, are a major source of players for the national team. Most of Cape Verde's current international footballers play outside Cape Verde (mainly in Europe, but also in Asia), and some were born outside the islands.

Several players of Cape Verdean origin have chosen to play for other national teams. These include Eliseu, Nani, Oceano, Manuel Fernandes, Rolando, Nélson Marcos, Jorge Andrade, Miguel and Silvestre Varela, who all represent Portugal, as well as Mickaël Tavares, Jacques and Ricardo Faty (Senegal), Patrick Vieira (France), Gelson Fernandes (Switzerland), Henrik Larsson (Sweden), David Mendes da Silva, Lerin Duarte, Jerson Cabral (Netherlands) and Rui (Equatorial Guinea), among other examples.

World Cup and African Nations Cup qualifiers
Cape Verde has never qualified for the FIFA World Cup but have qualified for the 2013 African Cup of Nations. Its first World Cup qualifying campaign was the 2002 World Cup qualifiers, in which Cape Verde was eliminated in the first round after one draw and one defeat against Algeria.

In the qualification campaign for the 2006 World Cup and the 2006 African Nations Cup, Cape Verde advanced to the Final Round after its first victory in a World Cup qualifier, beating Swaziland. In the Final Round, the team made an impression with its first-ever away victory against Burkina Faso, but finished fifth in its group and failed to qualify for either finals.

Old coach João de Deus from Portugal brought in several new players from European leagues for the 2010 World Cup/2010 African Nations Cup qualifiers. Cape Verde finished second in its group in the Second round, ahead of Tanzania and Mauritius, but behind Cameroon, and did not advance to the Third round. Cape Verde's top goalscorer of the qualifying campaign was Dady.

Then, finally, Cape Verde qualified for the 2013 Africa Cup of Nations, after stunning Cameroon 3–2 on aggregate.

2013 Africa Cup of Nations
On 14 October 2012, Cape Verde managed to secure their first ever berth in the Finals of the Africa Cup of Nations, when they defeated Cameroon 3–2 on aggregate score, following a 2–1 defeat to Cameroon at the Stade Ahmadou Ahidjo in Yaoundé, having won the home leg 2–0 in Praia just weeks prior to their qualification.

On 24 October 2012, Cape Verde were drawn into Group A of the 2013 Africa Cup of Nations, alongside Angola, Morocco and the host nation South Africa. Furthermore, Cape Verde played the opening match of the tournament at Soccer City in Johannesburg, Gauteng, against South Africa on 19 January 2013 – Soccer City being the host venue for the 2010 World Cup Final. Pulled from the fourth pot during the group stage drawing of the tournament, Cape Verde actually had the highest FIFA ranking of any team in their group at the time of the drawing, ranking at 51st overall, followed by Morocco (71st), South Africa (72nd) and Angola (83rd). Cape Verde also had the 10th highest FIFA ranking in the CAF zone at the time of the drawing as well.

Cape Verde drew with South Africa 0–0 in the tournament's first match, before drawing with Morocco 1–1. Platini scored Cape Verde's first ever goal at the AFCON, who were unfortunate to let an early lead slip. They however did win their first ever AFCON match against Angola, which they won 2–1 (despite an early own goal by captain Nando Maria Neves), through the late goals from Fernando Varela and Héldon Ramos, thus qualifying for the quarter-finals, and thus reaching the last eight in their maiden appearance at the Africa Cup of Nations.

On 2 February 2013, Cape Verde faced Ghana in the Nelson Mandela Bay Stadium in Port Elizabeth, in the quarter-finals of the tournament. Cape Verde played a good match, with 16 shots on Ghana's goal to their eight, with seven shots on target to their two, Cape Verde proved to be especially dangerous from set-pieces, however Ghana's keeper Abdul Dauda managed to keep a clean sheet making some spectacular saves, and with Mubarak Wakaso scoring a penalty kick for Ghana in the 54' minute, and then scoring again in the closing minute of the game (90+5') on an open goal, Ghana would win the match 2–0, to move on to the semi-finals, and ending Cape Verde's exceptional 2013 Africa Cup of Nations campaign.

2015 Africa Cup of Nations
On 15 October 2014, Cape Verde became the first of two nations to qualify for the 2015 Africa Cup of Nations alongside Algeria, joining the host nation Equatorial Guinea after defeating Mozambique 1–0 at home. The team, under newly appointed manager Rui Águas, picked up where Lúcio Antunes left off and managed to finish in the top two of the group stage with two matches remaining to play in the qualification process, having been drawn in a group together with Mozambique, Niger and Zambia. On 15 November 2014, Cape Verde secured first place in their group, finishing as Group F winners by defeating Niger 3–1 at home, with one match remaining to play for qualification.

Pooled from Pot 3 on 3 December 2014, Cape Verde were drawn into Group B of the final tournament, together with Zambia, Tunisia and DR Congo. On 18 January 2015 they played their first match against Tunisia at the Nuevo Estadio de Ebebiyín. The match ended in a 1–1 draw, with Héldon leveling the score off a penalty kick in the 78-minute. Cape Verde then drew 0–0 against DR Congo four days later, with the advancement out of the group stage depending on the final match results of both teams.

Facing off against Zambia on 26 January 2015, with both teams depending on the result of the other match between Tunisia and DR Congo and having to finish with a win themselves, the match ended in 0–0 draw, leaving both Cape Verde and Zambia eliminated from the Cup. Contested during a tropical storm, with 26 mm of heavy rainfall, Cape Verde exited the tournament tied with DR Congo for points and undefeated, yet losing to DR Congo on goal difference. Exhibiting good form, poise and defensive prowess, the team were only able to score one goal, while exiting at the group stage of their second appearance in the finals of the tournament, while remaining unbeaten in any Cup of Nations group stage match.

Other tournaments and notable matches
Cape Verde has two titles: It hosted and won the Amílcar Cabral Cup in 2000, and won the gold medal in the football tournament at the 2009 Lusophony Games. The team also won a bronze medal at the 2006 Lusophony Games. For the first time in its history, on 2 November 2002, it faced a non-African team, Luxembourg, in a friendly, resulting in a scoreless draw. On 4 September 2009, it faced Malta in a friendly, resulting in a 2–0 victory. On 24 May 2010, Cape Verde played out a 0–0 draw in a friendly match against a full-strength Portugal. At the time, Portugal was third in the FIFA rankings and Cape Verde were 117th. On 31 March 2015, a second friendly against Portugal resulted in a 2–0 victory in Portugal.

Stadiums

The team used to play their games at Estádio da Várzea. It is located in the capital city, Praia, on the Santiago Island. The stadium opened in 2006 and holds 10,000 people.

In 2014 the new stadium Estádio Nacional de Cabo Verde was opened, able to host a capacity of 15,000 people. On 15 October 2014 the team qualified for their second Africa Cup of Nations at the new stadium, in a 1–0 victory over Mozambique, making them the first of all teams in CAF to qualify for the tournament.

Recent results and forthcoming fixtures

The following matches were played or are scheduled to be played by the national team in the current or upcoming seasons.

2021

2022

2023

Coaching history
Caretaker managers are listed in italics.

  Carlos Alhinho (1985–1986)
  Óscar (1998–2003)
  Alexandre Alhinho (2003–2006)
   Ze Rui (2006)
  Ricardo da Rocha (2007)
  João de Deus (2008–2010)
  Lúcio Antunes (2010–2013)
  Rui Águas (2014–2016)
  Beto (2016)
  Lúcio Antunes (2016–2018)
  Rui Águas (2018–2019)
  Janito Carvalho (2019–2020)
  Bubista (2020–present)

Players

Current squad
The following players were called up for the 2023 Africa Cup of Nations qualification matches against Eswatini on 24 and 28 March 2023 

Caps and goals correct as of: 23 September 2022, after the match against .

Recent call-ups
The following players have been called up for Cape Verde in the last 12 months.

WD Player withdrew from the squad due to non-injury issue.
INJ Player withdrew from the squad due to an injury.
PRE Preliminary squad.
RET Player has retired from international football.
SUS Suspended from the national team.

Records

Players in bold are still active with Cape Verde.

Competitive record

FIFA World Cup

Africa Cup of Nations

 Honours 
 Amílcar Cabral Cup: Champions: 2000
 Runners-up: 2007
 Third place: 1995
 Lusophony Games'''
 Gold medal: 2009
 Bronze medal: 2006

References

External links

 O'JOGO: News on Portugese speaking African football teams
 Cape Verde at FIFA's home page
 RSSSF archive of results 1979–
 National Football Teams – Cape Verde

 
African national association football teams
Football in Cape Verde